DEFA (Deutsche Film-Aktiengesellschaft) was the state-owned film studio of the German Democratic Republic (East Germany) throughout the country's existence.

Since 2019, DEFA's film heritage has been made accessible and licensable on the PROGRESS archive platform.

History
DEFA was founded in Spring 1946 in the Soviet Occupied Zone in eastern Germany; it was the first film production company in post-World War II Germany.  While the other Allies, in their zones of occupation, viewed a rapid revival of a German film industry with suspicion, the Soviets valued the medium as a primary means of re-educating the German populace as it emerged from twelve years of Nazi rule.

Headquartered in Berlin, the company was formally authorized by the Soviet Military Administration to produce films on 13 May 1946, although Wolfgang Staudte had already begun work on DEFA's first film, Die Mörder sind unter uns (The Murderers Are Among Us) nine days earlier.  The original board of directors consisted of Alfred Lindemann, Karl Hans Bergmann, and Herbert Volkmann, with Hans Klering as administrative Secretary. Klering, a former graphic designer, also designed DEFA's logo. On 13 August 1946, the company was officially registered as a joint-stock company.  By the end of the year, in addition to the Staudte film, it had completed two other feature films using the former Tobis studio facilities in Berlin and the Althoff Studios in Babelsberg. Subsequently, its principal studio was the Babelsberg Studio built by Ufa in the 1920s.

On 14 July 1947, the company officially moved its headquarters to the Bablesberg Studio, and on 13 November 1947, the company's "stock" was taken over by the Socialist Unity Party or SED, which had originally capitalized DEFA, and pro-Soviet German individuals. Soviets Ilya Trauberg and Aleksandr Wolkenstein joined Lindemann, Bergmann and Volkmann on the board of directors, and a committee was established under the auspices of the Socialist Unity Party to review projects and screen rushes.

In July 1948, Lindemann was dismissed from the board of directors because of alleged "financial irregularities" and replaced briefly by Walter Janka. In October 1948, the SED was instrumental in replacing Janka, Volkmann and Bergmann as corporate directors with official party members Wilhelm Meissner,  and Grete Keilson.  In December, the death of Trauberg and the resignation of Wolkenstein resulted in two more Soviets in their stead, Aleksandr Andriyevsky and Leonid Antonov.

In 1948, the division of Germany into zones controlled by the Soviet Union and by the Western Allies came into effect. The SED eventually became openly Communist, with a strong Stalinist orientation.  On 23 May 1949, the Allies' Germany officially became the Federal Republic of Germany (commonly known as West Germany), and on 7 October 1949, the Soviet zone officially became the German Democratic Republic (East Germany). All DEFA interests were incorporated into the new nation as its "people's" film monopoly according to the strictures of Stalinist Communism and socialist realism, and effectively an arm of the government.  On 23 June 1950, a hardline Communist, was appointed director-general of DEFA.

As Soviet-Communist-Stalinist influences took hold at DEFA, the definition of desirable and acceptable themes for films became narrower. In June 1947, a film writer's conference held in Potsdam produced general agreement that the "new" German cinema would disavow both subjects and stylistic elements reminiscent of those seen on German screens during, and prior to, the Nazi era. By 1949, expectations for scripts were codified around a small number of topics, such as "[re-]distribution of land" or "the two-year plan". As in the Soviet Union, the excessive control placed by the state on authors of screenplays, as against other literary works, discouraged many competent writers from contributing to East German film. Screenwriters could find their efforts rejected for ideological reasons at any stage in script development, if not from the outset. As a result, between 1948 and 1953, when Stalin died, the entire film output for East Germany, excluding newsreels and non-theatrical educational films, amounted to fewer than 50 titles.

In the 1960s, DEFA produced the popular Red Western The Sons of the Great Mother Bear, directed by Josef Mach and starring Gojko Mitić as the Sioux Tokei-itho. This spawned a number of sequels and was notable for inverting Western clichés by portraying the native Americans as the "good guys", and the American army as the "baddies".

In 1992, after German reunification, DEFA was officially dissolved and its combined studios sold to a French conglomerate, Compagnie Générale des Eaux, later Vivendi Universal.  In 2004, a private consortium acquired the studios.  The films produced at the DEFA studios after World War II included approximately 950 feature films, 820 animated films, more than 5,800 documentaries and newsreels, and 4,000 foreign language movies dubbed into German, which were acquired by the privatized version of the former East German film distribution monopoly, PROGRESS.

In October 2005, the Museum of Modern Art in New York City hosted a two-week DEFA festival.

Das Stacheltier
Das Stacheltier is a satirical series of short films that was produced in East Germany by the DEFA Film Studios from 1953 to 1964. The short films were meant to be shown in film theatres preceding the newsreel and the main feature. The only feature film in the series was the silent film Der junge Engländer directed by Gottfried Kolditz in 1958.

Many well-known East German directors and actors contributed to the film series, including Frank Beyer, Erwin Geschonneck, Gisela May, Rudolf Wessely, Otto Tausig, Peter Sturm, Rolf Herricht and Heinz Schubert.

In 2019, Progress was acquired by LOOKSfilm. Since April 1, 2019, the entire film heritage of the GDR has been made internationally accessible and licensable on the Progress Film archive platform.

DEFA Film studios
DEFA-Studio für Spielfilme in Potsdam-Babelsberg (studio for feature films)
DEFA-Studio für Trickfilme in Dresden (studio for animated films)
DEFA-Studio für populärwissenschaftliche Filme in Potsdam, Alt-Nowawes (studio for educational films)
DEFA-Studio für Wochenschau und Dokumentarfilme in Berlin (studio for news reels and documentation films)
DEFA-Studio für Synchronisation in Berlin-Johannisthal (studio for dubbing)
DEFA-Kopierwerke in Berlin-Köpenick and Berlin-Johannisthal  (factory for movie copying)
DEFA-Außenhandel in Berlin (foreign trade)

Today PROGRESS is the distributor for all DEFA-Movies for Television and Cinema. Icestorm Entertainment  is the exclusive distributor for release for video and DVD. DEFA films can be rented or purchased from the DEFA Film Library at the University of Massachusetts and many titles in NTSC format are now available on DVD from US distributor First Run Features (see links below).

See also
 Babelsberg Studio
 Broadcasting in East Germany
:Category: East German actors
:Category: East German films
 Culture of East Germany
 DEFA Film Library
 List of East German films
 Ostern
 PROGRESS

Bibliography
 Allan, Sean; Sandford, John, (eds.) DEFA: East German Cinema, 1946–1992. New York and Oxford, Berghahn Books, 1999
 Allan, Sean; Heiduschke, Sebastian (eds.) Re-Imagining DEFA: East German Cinema in its National and Transnational Contexts. Berghahn Books, 2016
 Bergfelder, Tim; Carter, Erica & Goektuerk, Deniz, (eds.) The German Cinema Book. Berkeley: BFI/University of California Press. 2003.
 Berghahn, Daniela. Hollywood behind the Wall: the Cinema of East Germany. Manchester: Manchester University Press, 2005
 Beyer, Frank. Wenn der Wind sich dreht: Meine Filme, mein Leben. Econ. 2001.
 Elsaesser, Thomas & Wedel, Michael. The BFI Companion to German Cinema. London: British Film Institute, 1999.
 Habel, F.-B. Das grosse Lexikon der DEFA-Spielfilme, Berlin: Schwarzkopf & Schwarzkopf, 2000
 Heiduschke, Sebastian. East German Cinema: DEFA and Film History. New York: Palgrave Macmillan, 2013.
 Naughton, Leonie. That Was the Wild East: Film Culture, Unification, and the `New´ Germany. Ann Arbor, 2002.
 Preuss, Evelyn. "'You Say You Want a Revolution': East German Film at the Crossroads between the Cinemas." In Celluloid Revolt: German Screen Cultures and the Long 1968, edited by Christina Gerhardt and Marco Abel, 218-236. Rochester, NY: Boydell, 2019.
 Schenk, Ralf; Richter, Erika (eds.) apropos: Film 2001 Das Jahrbuch der DEFA-Stiftung. Das Neue Berlin, 2001.
 Schittly, Dagmar. Zwischen Regie und Regime: die Filmpolitik der SED im Spiegel der DEFA-Produktionen. Berlin, 2002.
 Silberman, Marc; Wrage, Henning (eds.) DEFA at the Crossroads of East German and International Film Culture. A Companion. Berlin/Boston: De Gruyter, 2014.
 Wagner, Brigitta B. (ed.) DEFA after East Germany. Rochester: Camden House, 2014.

Film
 East Side Story, a documentary that discusses DEFA's musicals

References

External links

DEFA Film Library and Online Shop
DEFA Foundation
PROGRESS, the distributor of the complete DEFA film heritage
Studio Babelsberg

State-owned film companies
Film production companies of Germany
German film studios
Companies of East Germany
Mass media companies established in 1946
1946 establishments in Germany
Mass media companies disestablished in 1992
German companies disestablished in 1992
German companies established in 1946